The Hawk's Nest is a 1928 American film directed by Benjamin Christensen. It is believed to be lost. It was released by First National Pictures and stars husband and wife Milton Sills and Doris Kenyon.

Plot
The title of The Hawk's Nest comes from the speakeasy around which most of the action revolves. Two bootleggers, played by Milton Sills and Mitchell Lewis, quarrel over a dancer (Doris Kenyon) while a political assassination plot.

Cast
Milton Sills - The Hawk/John Finchley
Doris Kenyon - Madelon Arden
Sōjin Kamiyama - Sojin
Montagu Love - Dan Daugherty
Mitchell Lewis - James Kent
Stuart Holmes - Barney McGuire
James Bradbury Jr. - Gangster(uncredited)

Preservation status
No prints survive, it is now lost.

References

External links
 
 
 

1928 films
American black-and-white films
American crime drama films
American silent feature films
1928 crime drama films
Films directed by Benjamin Christensen
First National Pictures films
Lost American films
1928 lost films
1920s American films
Silent American drama films